Christine Schmitt (later Christine Dressel, born 26 May 1953) is a retired German gymnast. She competed at the 1972 Summer Olympics in all artistic gymnastics events and won a silver medal in the team competition. Her best individual result was 11th place in the vault. She won another silver medal with the East German team at the 1970 World Artistic Gymnastics Championships.

References

1953 births
Sportspeople from Rostock
Living people
German female artistic gymnasts
Olympic gymnasts of East Germany
Gymnasts at the 1972 Summer Olympics
Olympic silver medalists for East Germany
Olympic medalists in gymnastics
Medalists at the 1972 Summer Olympics
Medalists at the World Artistic Gymnastics Championships
Recipients of the Patriotic Order of Merit